Woodgrange Park railway station is a railway station on Romford Road in Manor Park in the London Borough of Newham, east London. It has only limited station buildings and facilities.

Location
Its National Location Code (NLC) is 7467. It stands on Romford Road, a short walk from  station with which Woodgrange Park has an official out-of-station interchange.

History
Track was laid through the site in 1854 as part of the first section of the London, Tilbury and Southend Railway, from Forest Gate Junction on the Eastern Counties Railway to Barking. The LT&SR opened a more direct route from Barking to Fenchurch Street on 11 March 1858 so its trains could avoid the congested station at Stratford. After that the line was used by a small number of Liverpool Street to Barking services operated by the Eastern Counties Railway and after 1862 the Great Eastern Railway. A few goods trains also used this route.

In 1894 the Tottenham and Forest Gate Railway opened a new railway to Tottenham, beginning at a junction just north of the station site. This railway was a joint venture between the Midland Railway and London Tilbury and Southend Railway. The station was opened on 9 July 1894 and on opening was served by trains from the new line as well as the few GER Liverpool Street - Barking services. A few services were routed to East Ham via the East Ham loop but the majority went onto to Barking (with a small number continuing to Southend).

Some goods sidings were opened on the Barking end of the station and these acted as exchange sidings between Midland Railway and LT&SR trains as well as serving local businesses.

The exchange sidings lasted until 1909 when a new facility between Woodgrange Park and Barking was opened as Woodgrange Park and Barking Goods Yard (which acted as the exchange point between the Great Eastern and LTSR) were congested. The whole of this area was remodelled 1905-1909 as part of the quadrupling from Bromley to Barking and the electrification and extension of District Line services. By 1916 the goods sidings at Woodgrange Park were reduced to coal traffic only and continued in this role until closure whilst the former exchange sidings were used for engineering traffic.

Following the 1921 Railways Act Woodgrange Park became a London, Midland & Scottish Railway (LMS) station. In 1948 the station was taken over by British Railways following nationalisation. The spur from East Ham closed in 1958 when the few remaining T&FG services were diverted to Barking and its closure was part of the scheme to separate the LTS and District Line into two distinct railways. The engineering sidings closed 27 June 1964 and the station coal yard closed 7 December 1964. During 1964 the street level station buildings were demolished and replaced by a new structure and the platform buildings were demolished and replaced by shelters c1976. At this time the station was little used.

The section from Forest Gate Junction through the station to Barking was electrified in 1962 as part of the LT&SR modernisation and electrification scheme, and was used by a limited number of c2c services (which do not stop at Woodgrange Park) and by regular freight trains.

The station was closed between October 2016 and February 2017 whilst the rest of the Gospel Oak to Barking line was fully electrified. Electric London Overground trains (Class 710) began servicing the station from 2019.

Design
It is a station with limited facilities; the ticket office was demolished in the late 1990s, and the space used for a small cycle rack. Staff operate from a container-sized portable office. Recently a number of self-service touch-screen ticket machines have been added, which accept coins, credit cards and notes. Oyster card validators have also been installed. The station was briefly equipped with APTIS equipment in 1988/89.

Services and connections
The normal London Overground passenger service is four trains per hour in each direction, dropping to half-hourly in the evenings. The line is also used for freight trains to and from the Port of Tilbury and the railfreight terminal at Dagenham Dock. c2c's infrequent services to Liverpool Street also pass through without stopping.

London Buses routes 25, 86, 425 and night routes N25 and N86 serve the station.

Gallery

References

External links

Railway stations in the London Borough of Newham
DfT Category E stations
Railway stations in Great Britain opened in 1894
Railway stations served by London Overground
Manor Park, London
East Ham